ராமசாமி (Ramasamy or Ramaswamy or Ramaswami) is a common Indian name. It was used as a pejorative to refer to Indians living in South African European colonies. It may refer to

Politicians 
M. D. Ramasami, Aruppukottai MLA
S. S. Ramasami Padayachi, Tamil Nadu politician
Ramasamy, former Kovilpatti MLA
K. Ramasamy (politician), former Sivakasi MLA
Periyar E. V. Ramasamy
S. "Best" Ramasamy, president of Kongunadu Munnetra Peravai
Ramasamy Palanisamy, Penang, Malaysia Deputy Chief Minister
S. N. Ramasamy, former Sathankulam MLA
T. Ramasamy, former Srivilliputhur MLA
K. S. Ramaswamy Gounder, former Gobichettipalayam MP
S. J. Ramaswamy Mudali, former Arakkonam MLA
Arcot Ramasamy Mudaliar, Justice Party leader
V. V. Ramasamy Nadar, Virudhunagar politician
S. Ramaswamy Naidu, Swatantra Party politician from Sivakasi
P. Ramasamy Pillai, former Thiruvattar MLA
T. S. Ramasamy Pillai, former Kanyakumari MLA
Vivek Ramaswamy, American entrepreneur, Presidential candidate

Others 
Aarthie Ramaswamy, a chess player
Cotah Ramaswami, an athlete
N. S. Ramaswami, a sports journalist and historian
Cho Ramaswamy, Tamil comedian, politician and journalist
M. A. M. Ramaswamy, Janata Dal politician from Karnataka
Mythily Ramaswamy, Indian mathematician
Traffic Ramaswamy, a social activist from Chennai
Tripuraneni Ramaswamy, Telugu lawyer and playwright
V. K. Ramasamy (actor), Tamil actor, comedian, and film producer
V. K. Ramaswamy (umpire), former Indian test cricket umpire
Gorur Ramaswamy Iyengar, Kannada writer
Ramaswamy S. Vaidyanathaswamy, former Professor of Mathematics in University of Madras
Rathakrishnan Ramasamy, Singaporean juvenile offender

See also 

 Ramassamy

References 

Surnames
Indian given names
Tamil masculine given names
Surnames of Indian origin